Delaware Route 9A (DE 9A) is a two- to four-lane road in Wilmington, Delaware that serves as the primary access route to the Port of Wilmington as well as provide access to Interstate 495 (I-495). The official designation of the route runs  along Terminal Avenue between DE 9 and the Port of Wilmington, interchanging with I-495. Christiana Avenue originally became a state highway in the 1920s, serving as part of US 40 that connected to a ferry across the Delaware River to Penns Grove, New Jersey. US 40 was removed from this road in the 1930s and it later became part of DE 48, which was subsequently removed in the 1950s following the discontinuance of the ferry. DE 9A was designated by 1971.

Route description

DE 9A begins at an intersection with DE 9 in the city of Wilmington, heading east-southeast as two-lane undivided Terminal Avenue through residential areas. The road widens into a four-lane divided highway and comes to an interchange with I-495. Past I-495, the road heads through industrial areas, becoming an undivided road as it crosses over Norfolk Southern's New Castle Secondary railroad line at a grade crossing. The road crosses Norfolk Southern's Christiana Avenue Industrial Track before reaching the entrance to the Port of Wilmington at the Christiana Avenue intersection. At this point, DelDOT officially marks the end of DE 9A, but signage shows it turning north onto Christiana Avenue.

DE 9A proceeds north-northwest as a two-lane road, passing through more industrial areas and crossing under I-495 again, this time underneath of the I-495 bridge over the Christina River. After this, the route crosses over both the Norfolk Southern's New Castle Secondary and Shellpot Secondary at grade crossings in marshland. The road continues between residential and commercial areas to the west and industrial areas to the east before terminating at both US 13 and DE 9 near the Christina River drawbridge leading into Wilmington's central business district.

DE 9A has an annual average daily traffic count of 8,151 vehicles along Terminal Avenue. The portion of DE 9A along Terminal Avenue between I-495 and the entrance to the Port of Wilmington at Christiana Avenue is part of the National Highway System.

History
What is now DE 9A was a county road by 1920. By 1924, the Christiana Avenue portion of the route was constructed as a state highway. Christiana Avenue became a portion of US 40 in 1926, running from US 13 to a ferry that went across the Delaware River to Penns Grove, New Jersey. By 1931, US 40 was removed from this road. The road became the easternmost portion of DE 48 by 1936, which connected to a ferry that linked the route to New Jersey Route 48 in Penns Grove. DE 48 was removed from this road by 1952 after the ferry between Wilmington and Penns Grove was discontinued in 1949. DE 9A was designated around 1971 onto its current alignment.

Major intersections

See also

References

External links

 DE 9A at AARoads.com
 Delaware Roads - DE 9A

009A
Transportation in New Castle County, Delaware
Wilmington, Delaware
U.S. Route 40